InterGolf Disc Golf Course is a 9-hole disc golf course located at the Centre InterGolf in Granby, Quebec, Canada. The course is set on a low traffic 9-hole ball golf course. It was designed by Peter Lizotte in 2011.

Tournaments 

The venue hosts Le Boss de Granby, a PDGA-sanctioned event. It was the final course of the 2013 Québec Disc Golf Tour (QDGT). In 2019, an 18-hole layout was set up for the Série Disque Golf Québec Tour (SDGQ).

See also 
 List of disc golf courses in Quebec

References

External links 

 
 Official map
 Images of the course
 InterGolf on DG Course Review
 InterGolf on the PDGA course directory

Disc golf courses in Quebec